La Algaba is a Spanish municipality in the province of Seville, Andalusia, with a population of around 16,000. It belongs to the region of La Vega, 7 km from the provincial capital, Seville. The town dates back to the Byzantine Empire, and has many historical artifacts and significant churches. The river Guadalquivir features prominently in the history of La Algaba. The river acquires a considerable width here, with large poplars leaning over the water, and is surrounded by numerous orange orchards. Fishing on its banks is a common activity among locals. The town is also known for its many festivals.

History 
The earliest mention of a settlement in this vicinity comes from the early Byzantine Empire (sixth century CE), mentioning that the descendants of the earlier Tartessian civilization had founded the village of Balbilis at this location.  This village was later destroyed by the Visigoths. The town's current name comes from the Arabic  Al-Gaba , which means 'the forest'. Fernando III conquered the area in 1247 and gave it to his son Don Fadrique.

At Fadrique's death the area reverted to the crown. In 1304 it was given to the infant Don Alfonso de la Cerda, who later ceded it to the Duke of Niebla. Next, the area was ruled by Don Juan Guzman Medina Sidonia.  In the 16th century CE Philip II of Spain created the Marquess of La Algaba to counterbalance the economic hardship of the Treasury.  In the 19th century a municipal government was established.

The original nucleus of the population consists of an enclosure Walled wide to the characteristics of the population and has been overtaken by recent building. Thus, next to the limits of traditional hull neighborhoods built in the decades of the 1950, 60 and 70 are located, tending the most recent buildings (decades of 1980 and 90) to occupy agricultural spaces between the three physical limits urban space, which are: the river Guadalquivir, the local road SE-431 and the road of Santiponce.

Culture

Monuments 

The monumental face of La Algaba shows two main buildings, the Church of Santa Maria de las Nieves style Gothic-Mudéjar and contains cross vaults and Tower of Guzman, with a height of 27 meters, was conceived as a defensive building beyond the 15th century. Three floors linked by stairs covered with vaults, the most interesting part from the stylistic point of view the set of windows: Reduced arc, ogive, lobed or multi-lobed. The auction castellated crown this well-preserved monument located in the traditional center of the core.

The chapel of the Immaculate, in the neighborhood of the Aral, which was completely restored in 1929 and retains interesting sculptures like the Virgen de la Concepción, eighteenth century, and San Jose, which belongs to the school of Martínez Montañés.

Other items of interest are the Church of Nuestro Padre Jesus Nazareno, the Ermita de San Salvador, the Bullring, the Old Bridge and Roman necropolis.

Natural areas

Guadalquivir River 

The river Guadalquivir is the undisputed star in the history of La Algaba. While passing through this town the river acquires a considerable width between its two shores surrounded by numerous orchards of orange and large poplars leaning over the water. Fishing on its banks is a common activity among locals.

The history of this river has deeply marked the Algaba because of their large flood that have come to flood all the people and even caused by the force of the water, the fall of Old Bridge.

Rivera de Huelva River 
The river Rivera de Huelva is located in the western part of the municipality on the road towards Santiponce. It is formed by the union of water from one hand, the Brook Galapagar and, secondly, water desembalsadas by the El Gergal. Its channel flows into the Guadalquivir once past the main town of La Algaba.

Formerly it was a hangout for locals entire families during the summer time they spent weeks camped to its shores to enjoy activities such as swimming and fishing.

Gastronomy 
Are typical  pringás , the marinades of fish, duck with orange and cooked chickpea  peleaos  with morcilla. And among bakery products: cakes, fritters, piñonates home, the prieto bread or preñao bread.

Crafts 
In the craft of this Sevillian town highlights the work of leather and the wood carving and goldsmiths.

Festivities 
 Carnival of La Algaba: has over 25 years of history and is one of the carnival is famous in the region. They take place during the month of February. La Algaba is a town where this party is deeply lives. Villa birthplace of great carnival. During this month the Provincial Contest Chirigota s and Comparsas, and the Grand Parade takes place through the main streets of the town in which more than a hundred costumed groups involved.
 Easter: The Algaba is a cultural rich town cofrade. Brotherhoods that procession through the streets of the town during the Easter are: Brotherhood Captive on Wednesday Brotherhood de la Vera Cruz on holy Thursday, Brotherhood of Jesus Nazareno (www.hermandaddejesus.net) on the  madrugá  of Good Friday, Brotherhood of Solitude on Good Friday where procesiona the holy burial urn and the virgin of Solitude, dressed in mourning and low black pall, and the Risen One (of the Hermandad de la Soledad) the Easter Sunday, where a procession behind the Risen Lord and the Virgin of Solitude without pallium and dressed in white. There are also many other religious groups as Santa Marta and Habeas Christi among others.
Cruces de Mayo: take place the traditional Cruces de Mayo in the neighborhood of the Cross. Brotherhoods set up their booths during the last week of May. They are vital processions of the steps taken by the young brothers to walk around the neighborhood with his steps Cruces de Mayo.
 Pilgrimage of the Immaculate Conception (or Pilgrimage of La Algaba): the first Sunday of June is celebrated pilgrimage in honor of the Immaculate Conception of Mary Crowned. La Purisima La Algaba makes its way from the Church of Santa Maria de las Nieves to his hermitage of El Aral accompanied by pilgrims, romeras, horse riders and wagons.
  Velá García Lorca: it is held in mid-July in the neighborhood Federico García Lorca. The City Council and the "Association of neighbors García Lorca" a characteristic festive celebrate all the summer program for three days.
 Santa Marta: patron of La Algaba. Every July 29 Santa Marta accompanied through the streets of the town of representations of the brotherhoods of the town. Leaving the Church of Santa Maria de las Nieves starts the recovered touch 'bugle' from the four sides of the bell tower of Santa Maria de las Nieves. At the end of this recovered tradition, many children collect candy that are thrown from the bell to honor its patron. Arriving at the Church of Our. Padre Jesus Nazareno empezieza to rain from the algabeño sky many euro cents, blessed by it, by the algabeña patron, because tradition says that whoever owns one eurocent Santa Marta, will be lucky during that year in all aspects of daily life.
 Fair of La Algaba: best known for the Feast of the Bulls, held in mid-September. It is characteristic and known worldwide for its bullring (half car, half acementada lines). More than 30 years carrying celebrated dren cycles Promotion of Young Values that are famous in the world of bullfighting and great figures of the bullfighting world, such as Eduardo Dávila Miura, Fernando Cepeda, Manuel Jesus "El Cid " or José Tomás, have started their careers in the algabeño arena. After completing the run, the young algabeños jump into the ring to participate in  capeas . Fair Saturday and Sunday morning take place the confinements in the district of Santa Marta where young people run ahead of the bulls. At night in the Real Joy of the Fair spans the ring, stands and lanterns adorn and funfair nights La Algaba. It is a fair that welcomes many visitors from other cities and even in the capital, given the proximity of the municipality to Seville.
 Candevelares: it is a unique tradition of this town algabeña held on December 7 at sunset. It comes from  Cande-vela . According to the oral history of the village elders, means ensuring, wait around a candela, but ... what do you expect ?. The good news was expected was news of the dogma of the Immaculate, a candle was made and was expected overnight news dogma of the Immaculate. The origin of these candles goes back several centuries. For several weeks, children and not so children are divided into several groups to collect timber and firewood and make the biggest candevelá. In every neighborhood and village neighborhood of these large candles topped by a 'mounted' Joh  (doll made of cloth and wood chips to burn). Around these candles they are sung Carols and are taken typical Christmas sweets.

 Twin Cities 

Raynewood is twinned with:

  Chipiona, Cádiz, Spain;
  San Antonio de los Baños, Cuba;
  Modena, Italy.

 Illustrious 
 De La Algaba
 Diego Tristán, is a Spanish former player who played in the Betis B, Mallorca B, Real Mallorca, Deportivo La Coruña, AS Livorno, West Ham and Cádiz FC. He was player of the Spanish team and won the Pichichi Trophy with Deportivo La Coruña in 2002;
 Fernando García, designer and stylist. Award-winning Goya to Best Costume Design in XXIX edition by the film  The low island. Nominated for a Goya in the XXVII edition for the film Group 7. He has also designed costumes for movies like Cousins, 7 Virgins,  Astronautas,  Tuna and Chocolate and A Perfect Day, among others;
 Antonio Calvo Carrion, painter and creator of the movement that he called Universalism;
 Pedro Bazan, footballer in the 1950s played in the Real Jaén, CD Málaga (where he is top scorer), FC Barcelona and Deportivo Corunna. He was also player of the Spanish Selection;
 Dorita the Algabeña, coplera the years 1960 and 1970;
 José García Carranza (  The Algabeño son ''), torero foot, pole vaulter, Spanish rejoneador and landowner;
 Fermín Galeote, footballer Sevilla F.C. (1984/1985) and coach Sevilla Atlético and Sevilla C;
 Jose Rodriguez Dominguez ("Rodri"), footballer Sevilla F.C. (1964 / 65-1974 / 75). He also played in the Sevilla Atlético and Deportivo Alavés; International with the Spanish team in all categories.
 Javier Muñoz Arévalo, Spanish footballer currently as a goalkeeper at Atletico Ciudad. He also played in the Sevilla Atlético in Málaga B in Rayo Vallecano in UD Vecindario and CD Lugo;
 Fausto Velázquez Clavijo, director and creator of the theater group Teatro Algabeño in 1971. Also noteworthy was his role as painter, sculptor, gallery owner and playwright;
 Jose Cabrera Bazan, Professor of Labour Law, footballer (Sevilla FC, Real Jaén and Real Betis), political (Senator, MEP and chairman of the House of Andalusia accounts) and founder of the Spanish Footballers Association (AFE);
 Joaquin Herrera Carmona, pharmacist, writer, poet manners of things and Andalusian uses, musician and lyricist, self-taught painter, a school teacher and researcher of the drug. Founding member, editor and columnist of the journal Health Federation;
 Related Algaba
 Rodrigo Fernandez de Ribera, writer of the Golden Age;
 Cayetana Fitz-James Stuart (Duchess of Alba), XV de La Algaba Marchioness;
 Curro Romero, Spanish bullfighter;
 Antoñita Romero, coplera of the '60s;
 Andrés Molina Moles, songwriter, performer and composer.

Schools and high schools 
 C.E.I.P. Inmaculada Concepción
 C.E.I.P. Vicente Aleixandre
 C.E.I.P. Giner de los Rios
 I.E.S Matilde Casanova
 I.E.S Torre de los Guzmanes

References

External links
La Algaba – Sistema de Información Multiterritorial de Andalucía

Municipalities of the Province of Seville